Trinaest (trans. Thirteen) is the tenth studio album from Serbian and former Yugoslav rock band Galija.

Besides the lyrics written by the band member Predrag Milosavljević, songs feature lyrics written by poets Branko Radičević, Stevan Raičković and Petar Pajić.

Track listing
"Imali smo krila" – 4:30
"Ona zna sve" – 2:42
"Uzalud" – 4:21
"Balada o očevima" – 5:07
"Sviraj" - 3:39
"Srbija" – 2:30
"Poljubi me" – 3:51
"Kada prestane sve" – 3:50
"Ona još ne zna" – 3:53
"Cvetom do nje" – 3:11

Personnel
Nenad Milosavljević - vocals, acoustic guitar, harmonica
Predrag Milosavljević - vocals
Dragutin Jakovljević - guitar
Oliver Jezdić - keyboards
Branislav Milošević - bass guitar
Boban Pavlović - drums

References 
 EX YU ROCK enciklopedija 1960-2006,  Janjatović Petar;  

Galija albums
1996 albums
PGP-RTS albums